Riko Sawayanagi and Barbora Štefková were the defending champions, but both players chose not to participate.

Vania King and Laura Robson won the title, defeating Momoko Kobori and Chihiro Muramatsu in the final, 7–6(7–3), 6–1.

Seeds

Draw

Draw

References
Main Draw

Burnie International - Doubles
Burnie International